Vadim Semyonovich Spiridonov (14 October 1944 – 7 December 1989) was a Soviet film actor, film director. Honored Artist of the RSFSR (1984). Winner of the State Prize of the USSR (1979), Winner of the Lenin Komsomol Prize (1980).

Biography

Vadim Spiridonov born October 14, 1944 in Moscow. While still a student at the school, Vadim came to the drama club at the factory house of culture. In 1966, Vadim Spiridonov was determined to become an actor and passed the exams in all the major universities of the capital - Shchukin School, Moscow Art Theatre School, the University and went everywhere on competition. Chose to study VGIK, workshop Sergei Gerasimov and Tamara Makarova.

Vadim Spiridonov   a dramatic actor major talent and powerful temperament. In negative roles achieves complete transformation, creates absolutely authentic images. The key role   the former fist policeman Fedor Makashin (film series  Earthly Love  and  Destiny Yevgeny Matveyev ). Spiridonov gave so convincing way that the viewer is no longer separated it from the personality of the artist. Spiridonov bitterly recalled that he was after the movie  Destiny  won universal hatred among generations of soldiers and workers in the rear, and at the youth, told how he was repeatedly recognized on the streets and tried to beat, so hated was a traitor Makashin. However, this image has become a kind of prologue to the main role − Fyodor Saveliev in the long Soviet TV series  Eternal Call (19 episodes). Were among his roles and positive images, not just positive, and the role of the heroic and patriotic, which can rightly be proud of (captain Ivan Flyorov − Taming of the Fire,  Colonel Deev − Hot Snow,  Captain Volokh − Living till Dawn, Captain Orekhov −  People in the Ocean,  commander Semyon Budyonny − First Cavalry  and Not Subject to the Catechumens,  Colonel Vladimir Iverzev − The Battalions are asked to Fire).

Actor worked a lot and behind the scenes. Master dubbing, announced more than fifty both domestic and foreign films. Spiridonov's voice said over the years the world of cinema stars − Alain Delon, Gerard Depardieu, Jack Nicholson, Michel Piccoli, Patrick Macnee, Martin Landau, Sergiu Nicolaescu, Amitabh Bachchan.

In the mid-1980s, Vadim Spiridonov made his debut as a film director. The studio  Mosfilm, he directed a short film on the script Eduard Volodarsky called Two people. In December 1989 and Spiridonov planned to start filming his second movie, but unfortunately these plans were not destined to be fulfilled.

Vadim Spiridonov predicted his early death. Shortly before his death, in a conversation with his wife Valentina it whether in jest, or not, said: Die, would soon from this life. And not to go out, it is better to die in the winter, for example, on January 7.  Wife retorted:  People have a holiday, and you're going to die.  He thought a moment and said,  Well, then December 7   will make you a present  (my wife's birthday on December 8). In life, everything happened exactly in those words. On that fateful evening December 7, 1989 and Spiridonov had to go to Minsk, where in the next few days started shooting a new film based on the novel   of Vasily Belov   All ahead , where he was to play a major role. It seemed that there were no signs of trouble: the actor was cheerful, happy. For a couple of hours before leaving the house, he decided to take a nap, punishing Valentin  that she woke him up at the right time. But two hours later when his wife touched the husband, he was no longer breathing. The actor fell asleep forever. As it turned out, Vadim Spiridonov died in his sleep from a bout of acute heart failure immediately. He was buried Dec. 10, 1989 in Moscow at the Vagankovo Cemetery (station number 13).

Selected filmography
 By the Lake   as Konstantin Konovalov (1969)
 Hot Snow as  Colonel Deev (1972)
 Happy Go Lucky  as  Vasily Chulkov (1972) 
 Taming of the Fire  as Ivan Flyorov (1972)
 Eternal Call as Fyodor Saveliev (1973 /  83)
 Earthly Love as Fyodor Makashin (1975)
 Destiny as Fyodor Makashin (1977) 
 The Youth of Peter the Great as Fyodor Shaklovity (1980)
 Hit Back as captain Yevgeny Shvets (1981)
 Station for Two as Misha (1982)
 The Criminal Quartet (1989) as Lobanov

Recognition and awards
 USSR State Prize for the role of Fedor Saveliev in the film Eternal Call (1979)
 Lenin Komsomol Prize for the role of the Roman Bastrykov in the film Father and Son (1980)
 Honored Artist of the RSFSR (1984)

References

External links

 Vadim Spiridonov's Biography on    peoples.ru 

 Vadim Spiridonov on   kino-teatr.ru 
 Вадим Спиридонов на сайте «Рускино.ру»

1944 births
1989 deaths
Soviet film directors
Soviet male film actors
Soviet male stage actors
Soviet male voice actors
Russian male film actors
Male actors from Moscow
Gerasimov Institute of Cinematography alumni
Recipients of the Lenin Komsomol Prize
Burials at Vagankovo Cemetery
Recipients of the USSR State Prize
Honored Artists of the RSFSR